UNLP may refer to:
 National University of La Plata
 United Nations Laissez-Passer